A left-hander is a left-handed person.

The Left-Hander, or variants, may refer to:

Literature
The Left-Hander («Левша» Levsha), also The Tale of Cross-eyed Lefty from Tula and the Steel Flea, comic story by Nikolai Leskov 1881

Films
Left-Hander (1964 film) («Левша» Levsha), Russian film based on the story, 1964
The Left-Hander (1986 film) («Левша» Levsha), Russian film based on the story, 1986

Music
The Left-Hander (opera) («Левша» Levsha), Russian opera by Shchedrin 2013
"The Left-Hander", single by Dutch DJ Martyn (musician)

See also
The Left-Handed Man, 1913 American film
The Left-Handed Woman, 1978 German film
Lefty